The UCLA School of Nursing is a nursing school affiliated with UCLA, and is located in the Westwood neighborhood of Los Angeles, California.  The school is housed in the Doris and Louis Factor Health Sciences Building, known as the Factor Building, on the south end of UCLA's 400-plus-acre campus, adjacent to the Ronald Reagan UCLA Medical Center.

The UCLA School of Nursing's mission is to prepare nurses and scholars to lead and transform nursing care in a rapidly changing, diverse, and complex healthcare environment through academic excellence, innovative research, superior clinical practice, strong community partnerships, and global initiatives.

The school is consistently named to U.S. News & World Report's Top Nursing Schools list, ranking the master's program 16th and the baccalaureate program among the top 10 in 2021-22. It is also one of the country's highest research-funded schools, ranking in the top 20 among nursing schools in grant funding from the National Institute of Health.

History

Early Nursing Education at UCLA 

UCLA, a public research university in Los Angeles, was founded in 1919.

Nursing education at UCLA dates back to 1929. In the early days, registered nurses received certificates in public health offered through university extension courses.

In 1932 a group of public health nurses advocated for a Department of Nursing Education to be established in the College of Letters and Science. Dr. Elinore Beebe, RN, PhD, recruited from Yale, became the first director of the UCLA Public Health Nursing program under the Department of Bacteriology in 1937.

The 1940s was a time of reorganization and growth for the program. The Bachelor of Science degree was established within a new College of Applied Arts. In 1946 the Department of Public Health Nursing became the Department of Nursing, with faculty added to develop courses to prepare nursing supervisors.

Establishing a School of Nursing 

Professor Lulu K. Wolf (later Hassenplug) from Vanderbilt University was recruited to develop a nursing school at UCLA. Wolf had graduated with honors in 1924 from the Army School of Nursing, Walter Reed Hospital, and earned her BS from Columbia University Teachers' College in 1927.

In 1949 the University of California Regents (UC Regents) authorized the School of Nursing as one of the professional schools of the UCLA Centers for the Health Sciences, and Wolf was appointed the school's first dean. This action paved the way in 1950 for the opening of an undergraduate traditional program in nursing leading to the Bachelor of Science (BS) degree and the establishment of a graduate program leading to the Master of Science (MS) degree in nursing the following year. In 1966 the Master of Nursing (MN) degree was established as an alternate option to the MS degree. The MS degree program was discontinued in 1969.

Meanwhile, in the 1960s, the school hosted and participated in international programs with many countries around the world including Columbia, Egypt, Hong Kong, India, and Japan, which led to an increase in the number of international students.

The Regents approved the Doctor of Nursing Science (DNSc) degree program in 1986, and in 1987 the first doctoral students were admitted. In the mid-1990s, the master's degree designation MN was changed to Master of Science in Nursing (MSN), and the doctoral degree designation DNSc was changed to PhD in Nursing.

In 1993 admissions to the bachelor's program was suspended and the last class graduated in 1997. In its place, the Bridge program was introduced to meet the educational needs of students who are registered nurses with associate degrees or diplomas in nursing.

In 2006 the school reinstated a traditional / prelicensure BS program with admission at the freshman level and launched the Master's Entry Clinical Nurse (MECN) / prelicensure program option within the MSN degree program, which is designed for prelicensure students with bachelor's degrees or higher education in another discipline.

The UCLA School of Nursing is approved by the Undergraduate and Graduate Councils of the Academic Senate of the University of California at Los Angeles. In addition, the prelicensure (BS and MECN) and advanced practice master's programs are approved by the California Board of Registered Nursing. In 2011 the Commission on Collegiate Nursing Education (CCNE) accredited the existing bachelor's and master's degree programs for a term of 10 years, the highest that can be granted. UCLA holds Western Association of Schools and Colleges accreditation.

Academics / Degree Programs 

The UCLA School of Nursing offers five degree programs including Bachelor of Science (a pre-licensure program for undergraduate study), MSN – Master's Entry Clinical Nurse (for those with a baccalaureate degree in another discipline who desire a career in nursing), Master of Science in Nursing – Advanced Practice Registered Nurse (for nurses with a bachelor's degree in nursing), Doctor of Philosophy (for individuals who wish to pursue a research trajectory), and Doctor of Nursing Practice. Education is provided in both classroom and clinical settings. 
In addition to degree programs, the school offers summer research programs and accepts applications from all qualified nursing students with junior status from any undergraduate institution in the United States. The eight-week program is designed for students who plan to pursue a PhD degree and enter academic careers in nursing. Research areas include Biobehavioral Sciences, Biologic Sciences, Health Disparities/Vulnerable Populations, and Health Services Research.

Research 

UCLA School of Nursing scholars represent a wide range of disciplines including nursing, medicine, public health, statistics, epidemiology, physiological sciences, and the basic sciences. All are committed to scholarship in the service of improving health, wellness, and quality of life throughout the lifespan. Some examples of faculty research include:

The impact of heart failure and sleep apnea on brain function
Screening, prevention, assessment and management of pressure ulcers and wound care
Cellular targets for Alzheimer's treatments or prevention
Gene therapy that has high potential to advance the science in HIV/AIDS
Nutritional strategies to increase fertility
Cardiovascular impact from hookah smoking

Research Centers of Excellence 

 Center for Vulnerable Populations Research (CVPR)
 Center for American Indian/Indigenous Research and Education (CAIIRE)
 Center for the Advancement of Gerontological Nursing Science (AGNS)

Rankings 

Ranked #16 on the U.S. News & World Report Best Grad School Rankings: Best Nursing Schools: Master's   and among the top 10  Best Bachelor of Science in Nursing Degrees (for 2021–2022) .
Schools are ranked according to their performance across a set of widely accepted indicators of excellence.

NCLEX Pass Rates (for 2017–2018): BSN: 96% MSN: 95%

Deans 

 Lulu Wolf Hassenplug (founding dean of the UCLA School of Nursing, retired in 1968)
 Rheba de Tornyay (appointed 1971)
 Mary E. Reres (appointed 1977)
 Ada Lindsey (appointed 1986) 
 Marie J. Cowan (1997-2008) 
 Courtney Lyder (2008-2015) 
 Linda Sarna (2015-2021)
Lin Zhan (2021-)

Distinguished Alumni and Faculty 

Jeanne Quint Benoliel 
Bonnie Bullough 
Linda Burnes Bolton, MN ’72, DrPH 
Kathleen Dracup, MN ’74, PhD
Kristine M. Gebbie, MSN ’68, DrPH 
Afaf I. Meleis, MS ’64, MA, PhD 
Sister Callista Roy, MN ’75, PhD 
Other UCLA School of Nursing notable alumni

See also
List of nursing schools in the United States
American Academy of Nursing
NCLEX Pass Rates – California Board of Registered Nursing
UCLA School of Nursing Fast Facts
UCLA School of Nursing Spring 2019 edition
UCLA School of Nursing 50th Anniversary book (1949-1999 overview)
UCLA Nursing 50th Anniversary Summer 1999 edition

References

External links
UCLA School of Nursing 

Nursing school
Nursing schools in California
Educational institutions established in 1949
1949 establishments in California
UCLA Health